Drifters is a British sitcom created by Jessica Knappett. It stars Knappett, Lydia Rose Bewley, and Lauren O'Rourke. Drifters follows the lives of cousins Meg and Bunny (Knappett and Bewley) and their friend Laura (O’Rourke) who live in Leeds following their graduation from university. E4 broadcast four series, between 2013 and 2016.

History
The series first aired on E4 on 31 October 2013. On 9 May 2014, Channel 4 announced they had ordered a second series of Drifters. The new series began airing on E4 on 23 October 2014 and concluded on 27 November 2014. It began transmission on 23 October 2014, with each episode of the series premièring a week before its initial E4 broadcast on 4oD. On 9 June 2015, Channel 4 announced that a third series had been commissioned. It began broadcasting on 22 October 2015 and finished on 26 November 2015. In March 2016, Knappett confirmed that a fourth series has been commissioned. It began broadcasting on 10 October 2016. In June 2017 Knappett confirmed no more episodes would be made.

Cast
 Meg - Jessica Knappett, protagonist
 Bunny - Lydia Rose Bewley, Meg's cousin
 Laura - Lauren O'Rourke, Meg & Bunny's best friend
 Frank - Bob Mortimer, Meg's father
 Jenny - Arabella Weir, Meg's mother
 Mark - Philip McGinley, Meg's ex-boyfriend
 Gary - Bobby Hirston, Laura's partner
 Malcolm - Nick Mohammed, Meg, Bunny & Laura's employer
 Scott - Brett Goldstein, Meg's neighbour
 James - Sam Jackson, Meg's younger brother
 Sara - Alice Barlow, James' wife
 Hot & Cold - Perry Fitzpatrick, Meg's casual relationship

Episodes

Series 1 (2013)

Series 2 (2014)

Series 3 (2015)

Series 4 (2016)

DVD releases
The first series of Drifters was released on 25 November 2013 by 4DVD despite the sixth episode not being broadcast until 28 November 2013. The second series was released on 8 December 2014 by 4DVD.

References

External links
 
 Website
 

2013 British television series debuts
2016 British television series endings
2010s British sex comedy television series
2010s British sitcoms
Casual sex in television
E4 sitcoms
English-language television shows
Television series about cousins
Television shows set in Leeds